John Smith Hindmarsh (29 January 1913 – 1990) was an English professional footballer who played as a wing half.

References

1913 births
1990 deaths
English footballers
Association football defenders
Sheffield Wednesday F.C. players
Burnley F.C. players
Notts County F.C. players
English Football League players